The 1936–37 Michigan Wolverines men's basketball team represented the University of Michigan in intercollegiate basketball during the 1936–37 season.  The team compiled a 16–4 record, and 9–3 against Big Ten Conference opponents.  The team scored 741 points in 20 games for an average of 37.1 points per game – the highest point total and scoring per game in school history up to that time.  Michigan finished in third place in the Big Ten.

The team opened the season with a 61–12 victory over Michigan Normal (now known as Eastern Michigan University), setting a new scoring record at Yost Field House.  During the winter break, the team traveled to Seattle, Washington, to play three games against the University of Washington.  Team captain Johnny Gee (who later played professional baseball and basketball), was unavailable to play during the west coast trip due to a broken nose.  Michigan won two out of the three games in Seattle.

Franklin "Cappy" Cappon was in his sixth year as the team's coach.  Cappon had played basketball and football at Michigan from 1919 to 1923.  As a senior, he was awarded the Western Conference Medal for all-around excellence in both athletics and academics.  After seven seasons as Michigan's head coach, Cappon served as the head basketball coach from 1938 to 1961 at Princeton University, where he mentored Butch van Breda Kolff, Bill Bradley and Frank Deford. He compiled a combined record of 340–242 at Michigan and Princeton and was inducted into the Helms Foundation College Basketball Hall of Fame in 1957.

John "Jake" Townsend, a six-foot, four inch center from Indiana, was the team leading scorer for three straight seasons.  He scored 154 points during the 1935–36 season, 191 points during the 1936–37 season, and 226 points during the 1937-38 season.  Townsend's 191 points during the 1936–37 season broke the school's single season scoring record of 181 points set by Arthur Karpus in the 1918–19 season.  His career total of 571 points also broke Karpus's career scoring record of 338 points.  Townsend was selected as a unanimous All-Big Ten player at the end of the 1936–37 season and later played professional basketball in the National Basketball League for the Indianapolis Kautskys, Oshkosh All-Stars and Rochester Royals.

Schedule

Scoring statistics

Coaching staff
Franklin Cappon - coach
Assistant coaches: Bennie Oosterbaan
Fielding H. Yost - athletic director

References

Michigan
Michigan Wolverines men's basketball seasons
Michigan Wolverines basketball
Michigan Wolverines basketball